Wrestling at the 2015 African Games in Brazzaville was held between September 15–18, 2015.

Two Nigerian medallists were disqualified due to doping: 55 kg women's freestyle gold medallist Patience Opuene and 60 kg runner-up Ebi James Igbadiwe.

Results

Men's Greco-Roman

Men's 59 kg

Men's 66 kg

Men's 71 kg

Men's 75 kg

Men's 80 kg

Men's 85 kg

Men's 98 kg

Men's 130 kg

Results

Men's Freestyle

Men's 57 kg

Men's 61 kg

Men's 65 kg

Men's 70 kg

Men's 74 kg

Men's 86 kg

Men's 97 kg

Men's 125 kg

Results

Women's Freestyle

48 kg

53 kg

55 kg

58 kg

60  kg

63 kg

69 kg

75 kg

Medal table

References

2015 African Games
African Games
2015